An election to Meath County Council took place on 23 May 2014 as part of that year's Irish local elections. 40 councillors were elected from six electoral divisions by PR-STV voting for a five-year term of office, an increase of 11 seats from 2009.

Fine Gael remained the largest party, and gained 2 seats when compared to 2009, despite having a lower first preference vote than Fianna Fáil. The party was somewhat insulated by the additional seats allocated to Meath. While Fianna Fáil was the largest party in terms of vote share running too many candidates and transfer leakage, in LEAs like Kells, Ratoath and Trim in particular, saw the party miss out on potential additional seats. By contrast Sinn Féin were the major winners in the elections as the party returned a team of 8 to the new Council. Independents gained 4 additional seats, including Nick Killian, a former Fianna Fáil councillor. Labour lost all of their 4 Council seats in a testament to the anti-Government sentiment.

Results by party

Results by Electoral Area

Ashbourne

Kells

Laytown-Bettystown

Navan

Ratoath

Trim

References

Post-Election Changes
† Navan Fianna Fáil Cllr Shane Cassells was elected as a TD for Meath West in the Irish general election, 2016. Padraig Fitzsimons was co-opted to fill the vacancy on 14 March 2016.
†† Navan Sinn Féin Cllr Joe Reilly died on 1 June 2018 following a long battle with cancer. Edward Fennessy was co-opted to fill the vacancy in September 2018.
††† Ashbourne Fianna Fáil Councillor Seán Smith resigned his seat on 12 September 2018 explaining that he and his family were moving to the USA. On 29 November 2018 Conor Tormey was selected to fill the vacancy.

External links
 Official website

2014 Irish local elections
2014